Bart Deelkens (born 25 April 1978) is a Belgian football goalkeeper who currently plays for KFC Oosterwijk.

Honours
Westerlo
Belgian Cup: 2000-01

References

External links
 
 

1978 births
Living people
Belgian footballers
K.S.K. Beveren players
Sint-Truidense V.V. players
K.V.C. Westerlo players
MVV Maastricht players
Belgian Pro League players
Challenger Pro League players
Eerste Divisie players
Association football goalkeepers
Sportspeople from Hasselt
Footballers from Limburg (Belgium)